The Biblioteca centrale della Regione Siciliana is an historic library located on Via Vittorio Emanuele # 429 in central Palermo, region of Sicily, Italy.

History
A Jesuit school at this site was erected in 1586. Previously the ancient church of Santa Pantaleone was present here, alongside some homes. The Renaissance architecture is sober and functional. The interior has a large courtyard. After the expulsion of the Jesuits in 1767, their library became a royal school in 1782 during the reign Ferdinand I of the Two Sicilies and the instigation of Gabriele Lancillotto Castello, prince of Torremuza. It became a state library in 1860 and remained a national library until being transferred to the Regione Siciliana in 1977. The library now also encompasses the space of the prior adjacent church.

It is housed in the former Jesuit Collegio Massimo of the Jesuits (Collegio Massimo dei Gesuiti) of Palermo and the adjoining baroque former church of Santa Maria della Grotta.

See also
 List of Jesuit sites

References

Sources
http://mw.bibliotecacentraleregionesiciliana.it/MW/ 
http://anagrafe.iccu.sbn.it/isil/IT-PA0064

Buildings and structures in Palermo
Libraries in Sicily
Culture in Palermo